Erik von Frenckell (18 November 1887 – 13 September 1977) was a Swedish-speaking Finnish nobleman, member of the Parliament of Finland, member of the International Olympic Committee and a vice president of the International Football Association FIFA.

He graduated from Dresden University of Technology on engineering in 1912. After his graduation von Frenckell returned to Finland and worked on business management. In 1917 he was elected to Helsinki City Council as a member of Swedish People's Party. During the 1918 Finnish Civil War von Frenckell fought for the White Guard. From 1927 to 1939 he was a member of the Finnish Parliament.

Von Frenckell is best known on his work as a sports administrator. He was the president of Finnish Football Association from 1918 to 1952 and a member of the FIFA Executive Committee 1927–1932 and 1950–1954. On his first period von Frenckell served also as a vice president of FIFA. He was a member of the International Olympic Committee from 1948 to 1976. Von Frenckell was one of the key persons on Helsinki's nomination as the host of the 1952 Summer Olympics.

His daughter was Finnish avant-garde theater director Vivica Bandler.

References 

1887 births
1977 deaths
Politicians from Helsinki
People from Uusimaa Province (Grand Duchy of Finland)
Finnish people of German descent
19th-century Finnish nobility
Swedish People's Party of Finland politicians
Members of the Parliament of Finland (1927–29)
Members of the Parliament of Finland (1929–30)
Members of the Parliament of Finland (1930–33)
Members of the Parliament of Finland (1933–36)
Members of the Parliament of Finland (1936–39)
People of the Finnish Civil War (White side)
International Olympic Committee members
Association football executives
20th-century Finnish engineers
TU Dresden alumni
Presidents of the Organising Committees for the Olympic Games
Finnish sports executives and administrators
Football Federation of Finland executives
20th-century Finnish nobility